Tom Olof Siwe (born 2 March 1987) is a Swedish professional footballer who plays for Ljungskile SK.

Career

Club career
Siwe started his career at IF Hagapojkarna. He got his breakthrough in Husqvarna FF, where he came from IF Hallby. He was signed by Dutch club SC Heerenveen, where he only played for the clubs youth and reserve teams during the two and a half years he was in the club.

He returned to Sweden and during the summer 2008, he signed for Jönköpings Södra IF. Siwe made his debut for Södra on September 8, 2008 in a home game against BK Häcken (0-2). On 22 December 2010 he signed a new contract with Jönköping Södra for one year and with an option for one more. In November 2014, he extended his contract with the club for the 2015 season. Siwe made his Allsvenskan debut on April 2, 2016 in a 1-0 win against Kalmar FF. After the 2019 season, he left the club.

On January 12, 2020, Siwe was recruited by Ljungskile SK, where he signed a two-year contract.

References

External links 
 Tom Siwe at SvFF
 Tom Siwe at Fotbolltransfers.com

1987 births
Living people
Swedish footballers
Swedish expatriate footballers
Allsvenskan players
Superettan players
Husqvarna FF players
SC Heerenveen players
Jönköpings Södra IF players
Ljungskile SK players
Association football defenders
Swedish expatriate sportspeople in the Netherlands
Expatriate footballers in the Netherlands
People from Jönköping
Sportspeople from Jönköping County